The 1997 Colonial Athletic Association baseball tournament was held at Grainger Stadium in Kinston, North Carolina, from May 14 through 18.  The event determined the champion of the Colonial Athletic Association for the 1997 season.  Seventh-seeded  won the tournament for the second time and earned the CAA's automatic bid to the 1997 NCAA Division I baseball tournament.

Entering the event, East Carolina had won the most championships, with five.  Old Dominion had won three, George Mason had won two, while Richmond had won once.

Format and seeding
The CAA's teams were seeded one to eight based on winning percentage from the conference's round robin regular season.  They played a double-elimination tournament.

Bracket and results

Most Valuable Player
John Wagler was named Tournament Most Valuable Player.  Wagler was an outfielder for Richmond.

References

Tournament
Colonial Athletic Association Baseball Tournament
Colonial Athletic Association baseball tournament
Colonial Athletic Association baseball tournament
Baseball in North Carolina
College sports in North Carolina
Sports competitions in North Carolina
Tourist attractions in Lenoir County, North Carolina